was a Japanese novelist, and activist. She worked in the Asahi Glass Company. In April 1937, she married Yoshimune Yamashiro, a political activist who was arrested in the mass roundup of socialists and communists on April 16, 1929. In May 1940, Tomoe was arrested for allegedly aiding in the revival of the Communist party along with Yoshimune. They were both thrown in prison. Her husband died in prison in early 1945. After leaving prison following the end of World War II, she became active in agrarianism, and the anti-nuclear movement, and began writing about her experiences.

Works
Fuki no To  (Bog Rubarb Shoots). published in 1948.
Niguruma no uta (Handcart Songs) published in 1955. 
Toraware no onnatachi (Life of Women in Prison) published in 1980.

References

External links 
 Five years since the death of Tomoe Yamashiro | Hiroshima Peace Media Center

1912 births
2004 deaths
20th-century Japanese writers
20th-century Japanese women writers
Japanese women activists